Anders Hagen (15 May 1921 – 15 July 2005) was a Norwegian archaeologist. Hagen was most associated with the study of Norwegian archaeology and cultural heritage. He was a professor of Scandinavian Archaeology at University of Bergen and department  head at the University Museum of Bergen.

Biography
He was born in Vang, in Hedmark county, Norway. He finished his secondary education in Hamar in 1941. He enrolled in archaeology at the University of Oslo, and graduated with the mag.art. degree in 1945. In 1953 he published his thesis, which earned him the dr.philos. degree in 1954. While in college, he worked as a conservator at the University of Oslo.

In 1961 he was appointed as professor of Scandinavian Archaeology, University of Bergen. He also managed the department of cultural history at University Museum of Bergen.  Under Hagen's leadership, the  University Historical Museum developed both as an educational institution and museum.  From 1977 to 1980 he was the dean of the Faculty of Humanities at the University. He retired as a professor and department head, continuing as senior researcher until 1991.

Hagen published a large body of work, with research of considerable depth. He researched mainly  Norwegian settlement history of the Stone Age and Bronze Age.

He was decorated as a Knight First Class Royal Norwegian Order of St. Olav in 1989.

Personal life
In 1946 he married Sigrid Hjelmaas. He died in July 2005 at Bergen.

Selected works
   (1953)
  (1967)
  (1969)
  (1970)
  (1976)
  (1988)
  (1990)
  (1997)

References

1921 births
2005 deaths
People from Hamar
Archaeologists from Bergen
University of Oslo alumni
Academic staff of the University of Bergen
Norwegian environmentalists
20th-century archaeologists